Ahmed Mohiuddin (Urdu: احمد محی الدین) (8 January 1923 – 4 January 1998) was a noted scientist, scholar and researcher of Pakistan.

Early life and education
Ahmed Mohiuddin was born in Hyderabad, India, where he received his early education from Hyderabad.  He obtained his MSc (Biology) from Osmania University in 1945 with distinction. In 1945 he was awarded a PhD scholarship from government. He did a PhD in Zoology in 1948 from the University of London. He returned to Hyderabad in 1948 and joined Osmania University as an associate professor.

Career
Mohiuddin migrated to Pakistan in November 1948 and joined the Malaria Institute of Pakistan until 1952. From 1953 to 1960, he served for Karachi University. Later he was transferred to Sindh University, Jamshoro as chairman of the Zoology Department. In 1978, Mohiuddin joined Quaid-e-Azam University as Vice Chancellor and later became Vice Chancellor of Allama Iqbal Open University in Islamabad, Pakistan. From 1986 to 1988, he served East-West University, Chicago.

Mohiuddin was the founder of the Pakistan Zoological Society. He was awarded a fellowship from Pakistan Academy of Sciences and Royal Society of Tropical Medicine.

Mohiuddin was a highly cited biologist and zoologist in Pakistan.

Nationally and internationally, 37 of his books have been published on science and research.

Awards and recognition
Pride of Performance Award by the President of Pakistan in 1962

Death and legacy
Ahmed Mohiuddin died in Atlanta, US on 4 January 1998 at age 74.
 
In recognition of his services to the field of zoology, Zoological Society of Pakistan created the Ahmed Mohiuddin Memorial Gold Medal for talented students awarded nationally in Pakistan.

References

1923 births
1998 deaths
Scientists from Hyderabad, India
People from Karachi
Pakistani biologists
Pakistani zoologists
Pakistani scholars
Alumni of the University of London
20th-century zoologists
Pakistani people of Hyderabadi descent
Recipients of the Pride of Performance
Indian expatriates in the United Kingdom
Indian emigrants to Pakistan
Pakistani expatriates in the United States